Viva Pink is a Viva bus rapid transit line in York Region, north of Toronto, Ontario, Canada. It is operated by Tok Transit under contract from the Region of York.

Service on the Viva Pink route was suspended during the COVID-19 outbreak, and has not resumed as of January 2023.

Route description
Viva Pink runs on Yonge Street from Finch to Richmond Hill Centre and then turns east to run  along Highway 7 towards Unionville GO Station. Service began on January 2, 2006, and the entire line offers service during peak times only.

Stations
There are 21 stations on the Viva Pink line. From southwest to northeast, the stations are:

Rapidway

Viva Pink operates on the Highway 7 Rapidway between Richmond Hill Centre and Post Road stops. The rapidway is expected to be extended to Unionville GO Station in 2021.

References

Pink